Scott Drapeau (born July 25, 1972) is an American former basketball player known for his collegiate career at the University of New Hampshire (UNH). In just two seasons with the team, Drapeau scored 1,290 points, was a two-time First Team All-North Atlantic Conference selection, and as a junior in 1993–94 was named the NAC Player of the Year.

Prior to UNH, the Penacook, New Hampshire native starred at Merrimack Valley High School. He scored over 2,000 career points before enrolling at UMass as a freshman in 1991–92. After playing for the Minutemen for just one season, Drapeau then transferred to Southern New Hampshire University (then called New Hampshire College) and also played one season there. Drapeau ended up at UNH in 1993–94. The 6'8" power forward is credited with being the cornerstone of the two most successful seasons in UNH men's basketball history. They secured a school-record 19 wins in 1994–95 and went 34–22 between 1993–94 and 1994–95.

Drapeau holds UNH career averages of 23.0 points and 9.8 rebounds, which are second and fourth all-time, respectively, as of the end of the 2012–13 season. He has the top two single season scoring records with 648 and 642 points. He tried to pursue a professional basketball career as he entered the NBA Draft; however, he had torn his ACL but did not tell his agent, which forced him out of the draft and ended his playing career. As of 2017 he resides in Penacook, New Hampshire with his two daughters, son, and wife. In the fall of 2021 he took over the job of Bow high school Boys varsity coach for basketball  He is employed as an Activities Officer in a Correctional Facility.

References

1972 births
Living people
American men's basketball players
Basketball players from New Hampshire
High school basketball coaches in the United States
New Hampshire Wildcats men's basketball players
Power forwards (basketball)
Southern New Hampshire Penmen men's basketball players
Sportspeople from Concord, New Hampshire
UMass Minutemen basketball players